Saint-Cyprien is a parish in the Les Etchemins Regional County Municipality in Quebec, Canada. It is part of the Chaudière-Appalaches region and the population is 490 as of 2016. It is named after Christian martyr Cyprian.

Saint-Cyprien lies on the Canada–United States border.

Demographics 

Population trend:
 Population in 2016: 490 (2011 to 2016 population change: -10.6%)
 Population in 2011: 548 
 Population in 2006: 630
 Population in 2001: 603
 Population in 1996: 617
 Population in 1991: 664
 Population in 1986: 769
 Population in 1981: 838
 Population in 1976: 776
 Population in 1971: 905
 Population in 1966: 1,056
 Population in 1961: 1,101
 Population in 1956: 1,104
 Population in 1951: 1,058
 Population in 1941: 950
 Population in 1931: 626
 Population in 1921: 444

Education

The South Shore Protestant Regional School Board previously served the municipality.

References

Commission de toponymie du Québec
Ministère des Affaires municipales, des Régions et de l'Occupation du territoire

Parish municipalities in Quebec
Incorporated places in Chaudière-Appalaches